The Pastora de los Llanos were a baseball club which played in the Venezuelan Professional Baseball League between the 1997–98 and 2006-07 seasons. They were based in the cities of Acarigua and  Araure in Portuguesa, and played its home games at Estadio BR Julio Hernández Molina in Araure.

The Pastora de los Llanos were aligned in the Western Division as a replacement for the departed Pastora de Occidente, which were based in Cabimas.

Starting the 2007-08 season, the franchise moved to Margarita Island and was renamed Bravos de Margarita.

Yearly Team Records

Team highlights
1997-98: Alex Cabrera and teammate Luis Raven tied with Caribes' Magglio Ordóñez for the most home runs with eight.
1998-99: Luis Raven led the league with 18 home runs.
1999-00: Alex Cabrera tied with Cardenales' Anthony Sanders for the most home runs with seven.
2000-01: Alex Cabrera led the league with 13 home runs.
2001-02: Ramón Hernández won the batting title with a .376 average.
2002-03: Javier Colina won the batting title with a .355 average.
2004-05: 
Javier Colina led the league with 13 home runs and 51 RBIs.
Ricardo Palma posted the best ERA among pitchers with a 2.02 mark.

Other players of note
 
Brent Bowers
Mickey Callaway
Ramón Castro
Chris Clapinski
Howie Clark
Trace Coquillette
Jason Conti
Mike Duvall
Horacio Estrada
Ramón García
Alberto González
Beiker Graterol
Ryan Hawblitzel
Maicer Izturis
Ryan Karp
José Lobatón
Robert Machado
Garry Maddox
Rob Mackowiak
Hensley Meulens
Carlos Monasterios
Miguel Montero
Talmadge Nunnari
Kasey Olemberger
Luis Ordaz
Jarrod Patterson
Matt Perisho
Jake Robbins
Alex Sánchez
Alex Serrano
Marco Scutaro
Scott Stewart
Joe Thurston
Yorvit Torrealba
Eider Torres
Carlos Valderrama

External links
Official site
PuraPelota.com – Pastora de Los Llanos

1997 establishments in Venezuela
Defunct baseball teams in Venezuela
Sport in Portuguesa (state)
Baseball teams established in 1997